The Communauté de communes du Bocage et de l'Hallue  is a former communauté de communes in the Somme département and in the  Picardie région of France. It was created in December 1999. It was merged into the new Communauté de communes du Territoire Nord Picardie in January 2017.

Composition 
This Communauté de communes comprised 26 communes:

Bavelincourt
Beaucourt-sur-l'Hallue
Béhencourt
Cardonnette
Coisy
Contay
Flesselles
Fréchencourt
La Vicogne
Mirvaux
Molliens-au-Bois
Montigny-sur-l'Hallue
Montonvillers
Naours
Pierregot
Pont-Noyelles
Querrieu
Rainneville
Rubempré
Saint-Gratien
Saint-Vaast-en-Chaussée
Talmas
Vadencourt
Vaux-en-Amiénois
Villers-Bocage
Wargnies

See also 
Communes of the Somme department

References 

Bocage